Heptobrachia is a genus of tube worms in the family Siboglinidae.

Species 
 Heptabrachia abyssicola Ivanov, 1952 
 Heptabrachia beringensis Ivanov, 1960
 Heptabrachia ctenophora Ivanov, 1962
 Heptabrachia gracilis Ivanov, 1957
 Heptabrachia subtilis Ivanov, 1957
 Heptabrachia talboti Southward, 1961

References 

Sabellida